Coming Apart may refer to:

 Coming Apart (film), a feature film directed by Milton Moses Ginsberg
 Coming Apart (album), debut album by experimental rock duo Body/Head
 Coming Apart (book), a book by Charles Murray about the class stratification of white Americans
 Coming Apart (novel), a novel by Ann M. Martin